The Indian 50 paisa coin, popularly called Athanni, is a denomination of the Indian rupee, equal to half a rupee, that is very rarely found in everyday circulation. Currently it is the lowest circulating denomination of the Indian rupee. On 30 June 2011, when the 25 paisa and all other lower denomination coins were officially demonetised, the 50 paise coin became the lowest circulating denomination of the Indian rupee.

History
Prior to 1957, the Indian rupee was not decimalised. From 1835 to 1957, the rupee was divided into 16 annas. Each anna was further divided into four Indian pices and each pice into three Indian pies till 1947 when the pie was demonetised. In 1955, the Parliament of India amended the "Indian Coinage Act" to adopt the decimal system for coinage. Paisa coins were introduced in 1957, but from 1957 to 1964 the coin was called "Naya Paisa" (English: New Paisa). On 1 June 1964, the term "Naya" was dropped and the denomination was simply called "One paisa". Paisa coins were issued as a part of "The Decimal Series". In 2019, new coins were adopted, but the 50 paise coins were not minted as they have ceased to be in common circulation.

See also
 Indian paisa
Coins of the Indian rupee

References

Half-base-unit coins
Coins of India
Fifty-cent coins